Tortelloni are a stuffed pasta common in Northern Italy, with a shape similar to tortellini, but larger and with the extremities closed differently. They are traditionally stuffed with ricotta cheese and leafy herbs or vegetables such as parsley and/or spinach.

Some variants replace the vegetables with other flavorful ingredients such as porcini or walnuts. A common filling, especially in the provinces of Ferrara, Modena and Reggio Emilia, is a paste made mainly of pumpkin pulp and amaretti biscuits.

When traditionally made with ricotta and herbs, they are often stir-fried with melted butter and sage leaves; however, they may also be served with ragù.

As one of the few Northern Italian pasta dishes with no meat content, they are a traditional dish for Christmas eve.

See also
 List of pasta

References

External links
 

Emilia (region of Italy)
Types of pasta
Dumplings